"Shorty, Shorty" is a song by American duo Xtreme. It served as the first single for their second album, Haciendo Historia (2006). It is considered their most successful song to this day. It peaked at number two on the Billboard Hot Latin Songs chart. It also peaked at number one on the Billboard Tropical Airplay chart. They also recorded a fully Spanish Pop version and a remix version which were added as bonus tracks for the second album. The pop version was also added to the Platinum Edition of the album that was released in 2007 along with an English version of the song.

Track listings and digital download formats
Single 
 "Shorty, Shorty" – 2:54

Remixes
 "Shorty, Shorty" – 2:54
 "Shorty, Shorty" (Remix HSP) – 2:58
 "Shorty, Shorty" (Pop Version)" – 2:59
 "Te Extraño"

Mixes
 "Shorty Shorty" (The Friscia / Lamboy Spanglish Club Mix) – 10:15
 "Shorty Shorty" (The Friscia / Lamboy Extreme Dub) – 10:03
 "Shorty Shorty" (Cotto's Reggaeton Spanglish Mix) – 3:24

Charts

Weekly charts

Year-end charts

See also
 List of Billboard Tropical Airplay number ones of 2007

References

2006 singles
2006 songs
Xtreme (group) songs